Abuyama Kofun is a megalithic tomb, or kofun, that is located in Takatsuki and Ibaraki, Osaka in Japan. In 1934, the interred remains of an ancient nobleman were excavated from underground, and it has been hypothesized that the tomb was dedicated to the 7th century statesman Fujiwara no Kamatari, who is known as the founder of the powerful Fujiwara clan. The kofun was designated a National Historic Site of Japan in 1983.

History 
The tomb and the human remains buried inside a coffin were first discovered in 1934, but its contents were returned to the tomb with no further scientific analysis. Fifty years later, radiographic images and samples taken at the time were examined, revealing human remains wrapped in gold thread. The kanmuri headwear found in the tomb indicates that the person buried was a noble of the highest rank, or ataishokkan. It was concluded that it is highly likely that the tomb was dedicated to the 7th century statesman and aristocrat Fujiwara no Kamatari.

According to the radiographic image analysis, the preserved remains had a strong bone structure and an athletic body, with the so-called pitcher's elbow. The cause of death was complications from injuries to the vertebral column and lumbar vertebrae sustained from a fall, as if from horseback or a high ground. The injury is thought to have left the lower body paralyzed and could have caused secondary complications such as pneumonia or urinary tract infection. The cause of death matches that of Kamatari's, who is recorded to have died from a fall from horseback.

In October 2014, the Ibaraki City Education Committee announced that ancient sen bricks discovered at the Higashinara site in Ibaraki, Osaka match the bricks found in Abuyama Kofun. The site is believed to have been the location of Mishima Betsugyō, a villa where Kamatari stayed before the Isshi Incident which triggered the Taika Reform of 645 CE.

Abuyama Kofun was designated a National Historic Site of Japan on August 30, 1983.

References

External links 
 阿武山古墳とは – Kotobank
 

Kofun
Takatsuki, Osaka
Ibaraki, Osaka
Historic sites in Japan